The canton of Sinnamary (French: Canton de Sinnamary) is one of the former cantons of the Guyane department in French Guiana. It was located in the arrondissement of Cayenne. The canton consisted of two communes and its seat was located in Sinnamary. Its population was 3,373 in 2012.

Communes 

The canton was composed of 2 communes:
Sinnamary
Saint-Élie

Administration

References

Sinnamary